MEV, Mev, meV, or variation, may refer to:

Physics
MeV and meV are multiples and submultiples of the electron volt unit, (eV), referring to:

 1 MeV, 1 megaelectronvolt = 1,000,000 eV, and 
 1 meV, 1 millielectronvolt = 0.001 eV.
"MeV"≠"meV"

Biology
 Measles virus
 Mink enteritis virus, a species of parvovirus that infects mink and causes enteritis

Transportation
 M1133 Medical Evacuation Vehicle, an American military vehicle
 Mills Extreme Vehicles, a British kit car manufacturer
 MEV Automobiles, a British electric car start-up
 MEV, ICAO code for Med-View Airline, a Nigerian airline
 MEV, station code for Merthyr Vale railway station, in Merthyr Vale, UK
 MEV, IATA code for Minden–Tahoe Airport, in Minden, Nevada, United States

Other
 Map-entered variables, a variant of Karnaugh maps in logic optimization
 Mission Extension Vehicle, a satellite-servicing spacecraft developed by Orbital ATK
 Modern English Version, English translation of the Bible begun in 2005 and completed in 2014
 Musica Elettronica Viva, an Italian musical group
 Mev, a singular masculine possessive pronoun in Istro-Romanian grammar, equivalent to English "my"
 Mev., short for "Mevrou", Afrikaans equivalent of Mrs.
 Michigan Emergency Volunteers, a former name of the Michigan Volunteer Defense Force

See also

 
 
 MEV-1 (disambiguation)